The Kimberley froglet (Crinia fimbriata) is an Australian froglet found on the Mitchell Plateau in the north-west region of the Kimberley Mountains in Western Australia.

As part of National Science Week 2010, the froglet was listed as one of Australia's Top 10 New Species of new Australian species discovered in 2009.

References

Crinia
Amphibians of Western Australia
Amphibians described in 2009
Frogs of Australia